Plectocomia elongata is a species of plant in the family Arecaceae. It is native to Assam, India, Borneo, Cambodia, Java, Peninsular Malaysia, Myanmar, Philippines, Sumatra, Thailand, and Vietnam.

References 

elongata
Flora of Assam (region)
Flora of Indo-China
Flora of Malesia
Plants described in 1830